Sublime may refer to:

Entertainment
 SuBLime, a comic imprint of Viz Media for BL manga
 Sublime (band), an American ska punk band
 Sublime (album), 1996
 Sublime (film), a 2007 horror film
 SubLime FM, a Dutch radio station dedicated to jazz
 Sublime (literary), use of language that excites emotions beyond ordinary experience
 Sublime Magazine, a sustainability magazine
 Sublime (Marvel Comics), a comic book character
 Sub•Lime Records, a record label
 "Sublime" (song), a 2002 single by Shakaya

Other uses
 Sublime (philosophy), the quality of greatness
 Sublime, Texas, a place in the U.S.
 Sublime number, in number theory
 Sublime Text, a source code editor

See also 
 
 
 Sublimity (disambiguation)
 Sublimation (disambiguation)